Meißenheim is a municipality in the district of Ortenau in Baden-Württemberg in Germany.

Personalities

Sons and daughters of the place 

 Ferdinand Kopf (1857-1943), born in Kürzell, lawyer, member of parliament
 Karl Hoppe (1889-1963), politician (Social Democratic Party of Germany, Communist Party of the Saar), member of the Saarland Parliament 1947-1952

Other personalities related to the place 

 Friederike Brion (1752-1813), the youthful love of Goethe was buried in Meißenheim

References

External links
 

Ortenaukreis